Dustin Island is an island about  long, lying  southeast of Cape Annawan, Thurston Island. The feature forms the SE limit of Seraph Bay.

It was discovered by Rear Admiral Byrd and other members of the USAS in a flight from the Bear on February 27, 1940. It was named by Byrd for Frederick G. Dustin, member of the Byrd AE and mechanic with the USAS.

Maps 
 Thurston Island – Jones Mountains. 1:500000 Antarctica Sketch Map. US Geological Survey, 1967.
 Antarctic Digital Database (ADD). Scale 1:250000 topographic map of Antarctica. Scientific Committee on Antarctic Research (SCAR), 1993–2016.

Further reading 
 Defense Mapping Agency  1992, Sailing Directions (planning Guide) and (enroute) for Antarctica, P 379

External links 

 Dustin Island on USGS website
 Dustin Island on SCAR website
 Dustin Island on marineregions.org
Frederick G. Dustin Logbook at Dartmouth College Library

References 

Islands of Ellsworth Land